Forsmarksån is a river in Sweden.

References

Rivers of Uppsala County

https://sv.wikipedia.org/wiki/Forsmarks%C3%A5n